Halictus tumulorum  is a Palearctic species of sweat bee. Females are often pollinators of Cypripedium calceolus.

References

External links
Images representing  Halictus tumulorum

Palearctic insects
Halictidae
Bees described in 1758
Taxa named by Carl Linnaeus